Robin Lyth Hudson was a British mathematician notable for his contribution to quantum probability.

Education and career
Robin Lyth Hudson received his Ph.D. from the University of Oxford in 1966 under John T. Lewis with a thesis entitled Generalised Translation-Invariant Mechanics. He was appointed assistant lecturer
at the University of Nottingham in 1964, promoted to a chair in 1985 and served as Head of Department from 1987 to 1990. He spent sabbatical semesters in Heidelberg (1978), Austin Texas (1983) and Boulder Colorado (1996). After taking early retirement in 1997, he held part-time research posts at Nottingham Trent University (1997-2005), the Slovak Academy
of Sciences (1997-2000) and Loughborough University (2005–21), and a visiting professorship at the University of Łódź (2002) which awarded him an honorary doctorate in 2013.

Hudson was a mathematical physicist who was one of the pioneers of quantum probability. An early result, now known as Hudson’s theorem in quantum optics, shows that the pure quantum states with positive Wigner quasiprobability distribution are the Gaussian ones. Together with PhD students, Robin established one of the first quantum central limit theorems, proved an early quantum de Finetti theorem, and introduced quantum Brownian motion as a non-commuting pair of families of unbounded operators, using the formalism of quantum field theory. He collaborated with K. R. Parthasarathy first at the University of Manchester, and later at University of Nottingham and at Loughborough University, on their seminal work in Quantum stochastic calculus.

In later papers he developed a theory of quantum stochastic double product integrals and their application to the quantum Yang-Baxter equation, the quantisation of Lie bialgebras and quantum Lévy area.

Selected works

References

External links
Mathematical genealogy project page on Robin Lyth Hudson
Ancestry of Robin Lyth Hudson

1940 births
Living people
20th-century British mathematicians
21st-century British mathematicians
Probability theorists
Alumni of the University of Oxford
Academics of the University of Nottingham